Harry Gregson-Williams (born 13 December 1961) is a British composer, conductor, orchestrator, and record producer. He has composed music for video games, television and films including the Metal Gear series, Spy Game, Phone Booth, Man on Fire, The Chronicles of Narnia: The Lion, the Witch and the Wardrobe, Déjà Vu, X-Men Origins: Wolverine, The Martian, Antz, The Tigger Movie, Chicken Run, the Shrek franchise, Sinbad: Legend of the Seven Seas, Flushed Away, Arthur Christmas, Early Man, and Catch-22. He is the older brother of composer Rupert Gregson-Williams.

Education
Gregson-Williams won a musical scholarship to St John's College School in Cambridge at the age of seven. He was a child chorister at the school and later attended Stowe School, a boarding independent school in the civil parish of Stowe in Buckinghamshire, where he was a music scholar. He next went to the Guildhall School of Music and Drama in London.

He learned to play the piano as a child on a Broadwood piano which his father had bought with the winnings from a hundred-to-one bet during the Grand National.

Discography

Film

1990s

2000s

2010s

2020s

Television

Video games

Rides

Awards and nominations

Primetime Emmy Awards

References

External links

Facebook
Artist profile at OverClocked ReMix

An interview with Harry Gregson-Williams
Epicenter Games Interviews Harry Gregson-Williams, an interview with Harry Gregson-Williams regarding Metal Gear Solid 3: Snake Eater, from EpicenterGames
Harry Gregson-Williams at Scorereviews.com

1961 births
20th-century English composers
20th-century English male musicians
21st-century English composers
21st-century English male musicians
Aardman Animations people
Academics of the Guildhall School of Music and Drama
Alumni of the Guildhall School of Music and Drama
Alumni of St John's College, Cambridge
Animated film score composers
Annie Award winners
DreamWorks Animation people
Sony Pictures Animation people
English film score composers
English male film score composers
Living people
People educated at Stowe School
Varèse Sarabande Records artists
Video game composers